The discography of South Korean solo-artist Juniel consists of one studio album, six extended plays, ten singles, and ten music videos.

Juniel made her debut in 2011 with the extended play Ready Go, which was released in Japan. She composed all the songs in the album and later took part in writing lyrics, as well as composing all her songs in subsequent Japanese releases. On March 6, 2013, Juniel released her first Japan major album titled Juni which consists of 11 self-composed songs and a Japanese version of duet song 'Babo' with CNBLUE's Jung Yong-hwa.

Studio albums

Extended plays

Singles

As lead artist

As featured artist

Music videos

References

Discographies of South Korean artists
K-pop discographies